The Thirteen Martyrs of Arad were the thirteen Hungarian rebel generals who were executed by the Austrian Empire on 6 October 1849 in the city of Arad, then part of the Kingdom of Hungary (now in Romania), after the Hungarian Revolution (1848–1849). The execution was ordered by the Austrian general Julius Jacob von Haynau.

Background 
In a historic speech on 3 March 1848, shortly after news of the revolution in Paris had arrived, Lajos Kossuth demanded parliamentary government for Hungary and constitutional government for the rest of Austria. The Revolution started on 15 March 1848, and after military setbacks in the winter and a successful campaign in the spring, Kossuth declared independence on 19 April 1849. By May 1849, the Hungarians controlled all of the country except Buda, which they won after a three-week bloody siege. The hopes of ultimate success, however, were frustrated by the intervention of Russia.

After all appeals to other European states failed, Kossuth abdicated on 11 August 1849, in favor of Artúr Görgei, who he thought was the only general capable of saving the nation. On 13 August 1849, Görgei signed a surrender at Világos (now Şiria, Romania) to the Russians, who handed the army over to the Austrians. At the insistence of the Russians, Görgei was spared. The Austrians took reprisals on other officers of the Hungarian army.

The thirteen Hungarian generals were executed by hanging at Arad on October 6, 1849, with the exception of Arisztid Dessewffy and two others, because of their friendship to the Prince of Luxembourg. A hanging was deemed a humiliation, so they were executed by a firing squad of 12. On the same day, Count Lajos Batthyány (1806–1849), the first Hungarian prime minister, was executed in Pest at an Austrian military garrison.

Kossuth fled to the Ottoman Empire; he maintained that Görgei alone was responsible for the failure of the rebellion, calling him "Hungary's Judas". Others, looking at the impossible situation Görgei was given, have been more sympathetic. They have said that, given the circumstances, he was left with no option other than surrender.

One of the public squares contains a martyrs' monument, erected in the memory of the generals. It consists of a colossal figure of Hungary, with four allegorical groups, and medallions of the executed generals.

Hungarians have come to regard the thirteen rebel generals as martyrs for defending the cause of freedom and independence for their people. The majority of the generals were not of ethnic Hungarian origin, but they fought for the cause of an independent and — for its age — liberal Hungary. Baron Gyula Ottrubay Hruby, who was also executed in Arad, was actually Czech and spoke German, while Damjanich was of Serb origin. The anniversary of their execution is remembered on October 6 as a day of mourning for Hungary.

The generals 

 Lajos Aulich (1793–1849)
 János Damjanich (1804–1849)
 Arisztid Dessewffy (1802–1849)
 Ernő Kiss (1799–1849)
 Károly Knezić (1808–1849)
 György Lahner (1795–1849)
 Vilmos Lázár (1815–1849)
 Károly Leiningen-Westerburg (1819–1849)
 József Nagysándor (1804–1849)
 Ernő Poeltenberg (1814–1849)
 József Schweidel (1796–1849)
 Ignác Török (1795–1849)
 Károly Vécsey (1807–1849)

Custom 
Legend has it that while the revolutionary leaders were being executed, Austrian soldiers were drinking beer and arrogantly clinking their beer mugs together in celebration of Hungary's defeat. Hungarians therefore vowed not to clink glasses again while drinking beer for 150 years.

In reality, however, there is no information regarding this event at all, and historians deem it unlikely to have happened. Historian Róbert Hermann speculated that wine producers hoping to raise their profits were the ones who popularized the tradition. While the Hungarians' vow supposedly expired on 6 October 1999, in practice, this tradition continues to be sporadically practiced today.

References 

 
1849 in Hungary
1849 in the Austrian Empire
19th-century Hungarian people